Kritou Terra ( []) is a village in the Paphos District of Cyprus, located 3 km east of Dhrousha. Kritou Terra is located 479 m above sea level. It receives 630 mm of rainfall annually. Situated in the area of Laona, as the wider area is called and in a landscape surrounded by high mountain peaks and to the north overlooking the Gulf of Chrysochous, Kritou Terra is built at an altitude of 465 meters, is one of the ampelochoria (wine-producing villages of Cyprus) of the island and is considered one of the most beautiful and picturesque villages of the province. It has fantastic climatic conditions and because it’s located by the third biggest spring in Cyprus it’s green all year round.

Climate 

The climate here is mild, and generally warm and temperate. There is more rainfall in the winter than in the summer in Kritou Terra. The climate here is classified as Csa by the Köppen-Geiger system. The average annual temperature in Kritou Terra is 17.2 °C.

Distances 
Tsada 21 km

Paphos 29 km

Paphos Airport 45 km 

Larnaca Airport 171 km

References

Communities in Paphos District